Stresemann's bristlefront (Merulaxis stresemanni) is a critically endangered species of bird in the family Rhinocryptidae, the tapaculos. It is endemic to Brazil.

Taxonomy and systematics

Stresemann's bristlefront and the slaty bristlefront (Merulaxis ater) form a superspecies, and the two might actually be one species. It has no subspecies. It is known only from three specimens and a few photographs, audio recordings, and sight records.

Description

Stresemann's bristlefront is a medium-sized, long-tailed bird with distinctive forehead bristles. The male is all slaty gray with a dark rufous-chestnut rump, uppertail-coverts, and vent. The namesake features are long, pointed bristles on the forehead. The female is cinnamon-brown above, with a duskier tail, and is bright cinnamon below.

Distribution and habitat

Stresemann's bristlefront's natural habitat is subtropical or tropical moist lowland forest. It is threatened by habitat loss, and the Mata do Passarinho Reserve is the last known area to house Stresemann's bristlefront. The Atlantic forest reserve is in the states of Minas Gerais and Bahia and contains primary forest as well as secondary forest, and is an island of forest surrounded by farmland.

Behavior

Feeding

A Stresemann's bristlefront was observered "foraging on the ground and on fallen tree trunks in an area of drier forest between two humid valleys". It has been seen to feed on insects.

Breeding

The nest itself was not described.

Vocalization

The Stresemann's bristlefront song starts with clicks followed by a trill. It is similar to that of the closely related slaty bristlefront but lower pitched. It readily responds to playback.

Status

The Stressemann's bristlefront is one of the rarest birds on earth. The IUCN has assessed it as Critically Endangered. An extensive search was performed in 2019, and the species was last seen in a tiny forest remnant, now set aside as the Mata do Passarinho Reserve. The IUCN believes that fewer than 50 mature individuals survive. "The species' known range is tiny...and the little remaining forest is disappearing rapidly; although this species is legally protected, there seems little hope for its survival."

References

External links
 
 
 
 
 
 
 

Stresemann's bristlefront
Birds of the Atlantic Forest
Endemic birds of Brazil
Critically endangered animals
Critically endangered biota of South America
Stresemann's bristlefront
Stresemann's bristlefront
Taxonomy articles created by Polbot